Qiniq also spelled Qïnïq, Qynyk or Qynyq, was an Oghuz Turkic (or Turkmen) tribe.

Oghuz tribes

Oghuz Turks were a branch of Turkic peoples. In the early Medieval Ages, most of them were nomads and their political structure was tribal. There were 22 or 24 Oghuz tribes. The tribes were listed in a number of medieval books with Islamic sources calling Muslim Oghuzes as Turkmen by the 10th century. They were also mentioned in Oghuz legend. According to the myth, there were 24 tribes in two main groups. Each group was represented by three brothers and each brother was supposed to have four sons. In this classification Qiniq tribe is the descendant of Deniz Khan who in turn was in the group of Üçok.

According to Islam Encyclopaedia, Kınık means "Great everywhere". In the 11th-century compendium of Turkic languages Dīwānu l-Luġat al-Turk, produced by Mahmud of Kashgar, the Qiniq tribe is listed first. However, in the list arranged by Rashid-al-Din Hamadani in the 13th century, Qiniq comes last. In his work Shajara-i Tarākima (Genealogy of Turkmens), Abul-Ghazi, the khan and historian of the Khanate of Khiva, mentioned the Qiniq tribe as descendants of Tengiz Khan with the name of the tribe meaning "honourable".

Qiniq and the Seljuks 
Qiniq is historically notable because the Seljuk Empire was founded by the representatives of the Qiniq tribe. In the 10th century the tribe leader was Dukak (nicknamed , "with iron bow"). He was followed by his son Seljuk and then grandson Arslan Yabgu. The Seljuk Empire was founded by Arslan's nephews Tughril and Chagri . The Seljuks of Anatolia, a branch of Seljuks, was founded by Suleiman ibn Qutalmish, Arslan Yabgu's grandson.

Abu al-Ghazi Bahadur wrote in his Shajara-i Tarākima the following:
"When Seljuks became masters of the Muslim world, they said: "We are of the Kinik tribe of the Turkmens," and then they said, "We fled from Kay Khosrow, the son of Afrasiab, and became the Kinik tribe of the Turkmens." The Seljuks counted their fathers and stopped at Afrasiab after 35 generations, saying that they were the sons and descendants of Afrasiab."

Qiniq in Anatolia
Most of the Qiniq migrated to Anatolia during the reign of the Seljuk Empire and the Mongol Invasion in the 13th century. In the Ottoman official records of the 16th century, there were 81 settlements named . Although they have been largely absorbed by other Oghuz tribes throughout the history, there are still many settlements which bear the name . For example, in İzmir Province,  is the name of one of the ilçe (district) centers. There are also many villages.

Settlements bearing the name 

Afyonkarahisar Province
 Kınık, Dinar
 Kınık, Sandıklı
 Kınık, Sinanpaşa

Ankara Province
 Kınık, Kalecik
 Kınık, Kazan
 Kınık (Aşağı), Kızılcahamam
 Kınık (Yukarı), Kızılcahamam

Antalya Province
 Kınık, Kaş

Bilecik Province
 Kınık, Bilecik After the fall of the Seljuk Sultanate of Rum,one of the Oghuz tribe's Kayi tribe bey Ertugrul fought with the Byzantines in the border region of Seljuk empire and the Niceae Empire called Soghut which is now located in the Bilecik province of Turkey. It is said that the Kayi tribe was given the responsibility of defence of western borders by Seljuk sultan, Kekubad. After the Mongol invasion of Anatolia, Ertugrul along with his Alps fought with the Byzantines from the west and established his own following. Later his son, Osman marked the beginning of great Ottoman Empire which ruled world for 600 years from 1299-1921 and gained peak in 1692.
 Kınık, Pazaryeri

Qiniq in Turkmenistan 
The Turkmen clan of Gabyrdy is believed to descend from Kara Arslan Ahmad Qavurt  who belonged to the Qinik tribe and was a military commander and a son of Chaghri Beg, the co-ruler of the early Seljuk Empire.

References

Seljuk Empire
Oghuz tribes